Protea gaguedi is a species of tree which belongs to the genus Protea.

Common names and etymology
This tree is known by the common name of African protea.

Other vernacular names for this species used in South Africa include African sugarbush, African white sugarbush, deciduous sugarbush or white sugarbush. In isiZulu and Ndebele it is known as isiqalaba, in the Northern Sotho language it is called segwapi, and in Venda tshizungu. In Shona it may be called mubonda, mumhonda, or musitsuru. In Afrikaans this species is known by the vernacular names of Afrika-witsuikerbos, grootsuikerbos, groot-suikerbos, suikerbos or witsuikerbos.

Taxonomy
P. gaguedi was first described as a new species by Johann Friedrich Gmelin in 1791.

Description
This plant usually grows in the form of a small, erect to gnarled tree, reaching up to three metres in height.

It has leaves which are oblong to elliptic, and often distinctly sickle-shaped. The leaves are glabrous (hairless) when mature, except for a few hairs near the base of the blade. The leaves are coloured light green to blue-green. The prominent midrib of the leaves is coloured somewhat yellowish.

It usually has solitary flower heads, a specialised type of inflorescence. These flower heads are quite variable in form, but can grow up to 11 cm in diameter. The flower heads are densely hairy and have a very strong scent. The outer involucral bracts range in colour from pink, to greenish-white, to white. The inner bracts are covered in silver hairs and are coloured pale green. The margins of the bracts may or may not have rusty-coloured hairs sprouting from them.

The fruit is a hairy nutlet.

Similar species
It is similar to P. welwitschii, but this species has 60mm diameter flower heads which are usually clustered together in groups of three or four, and young leaves densely covered in hairs, with older leaves retaining pubescence at their base.

Distribution
It is widely distributed in Africa, from Eritrea in the north, to KwaZulu-Natal in South Africa. It does not occur in the Sahel of West Africa. Countries it occurs in include Sudan (including South Sudan), Eritrea, Ethiopia, Burundi, Rwanda, Uganda, Kenya, Tanzania, the Democratic Republic of Congo, Zambia, Angola, Botswana, Zimbabwe, Malawi, Mozambique, Namibia, eSwatini and South Africa.

In South Africa it is a widespread species across the north of the country, and can be found in Gauteng, KwaZulu-Natal, Limpopo, Mpumalanga and North West Province.

Ecology
It found in a variety of habitats, although it is often grows on rocky ground.

Conservation
Protea gaguedi is a widespread and common tree.

References

gaguedi
Flora of Ethiopia
Flora of East Tropical Africa
Flora of Burundi
Flora of Rwanda
Flora of South Tropical Africa
Flora of Southern Africa
Taxa named by Johann Friedrich Gmelin
Plants described in 1791